The Association of Hispanic Arts (AHA) is a New York-based non-profit organization founded in 1975 that promotes the work of Hispanic artists. It holds an annual Hispanic Arts Festival in the city, and publishes a quarterly magazine, AHA! Hispanic Arts News.

The organisation won a Mayor's Award of Honor for Arts and Culture from the Mayor of New York David Dinkins in 1992 for its counseling and advocacy of Hispanic artists. In 1995, the group picketed the opening of The Perez Family, a film about Cuban refugees whose cast was mostly non-Hispanic.

See also
Hispanic culture

References

External links
Association of Hispanic Arts
New York State Arts entry

Arts organizations based in New York City
Hispanic and Latino American culture in New York City
Hispanic and Latino American organizations
Non-profit organizations based in New York City
Arts organizations established in 1975
1975 establishments in New York City